Mary Puthisseril Verghese (1925–1986) was a physician in India who was among the earliest pioneers of Physical medicine and rehabilitation in the country. Mary Verghese was instilled in a home where love and respect were two main factors in their close knit family. She was caring of others and wanted to give back to her community in any way that she could. In 1963, she took charge of what was the first department of Physical Medicine and Rehabilitation with an inpatient facility in India at the Christian Medical College, Vellore. She was instrumental in expanding the services of the department with the establishment of the first inpatient rehabilitation institute of the country in 1966. In recognition of her contributions to the field of medicine, she was awarded the Padma Shri by the Government of India in 1972.

An award has been instituted in her memory by the Mary Verghese Trust, and the first Dr. Mary Verghese Award for Excellence in Empowering Ability was given in 2012 to S. Ramakrishnan, founder and president of the Amar Seva Sangam. To this day, Mary Verghese is viewed as a respected physician and woman that strived to better peoples lives.

Early life and education
Mary Verghese was born in Cherai village, Cochin, Kerala, India, in a prosperous family. Her father was a respected leader in the local church and community. She was the seventh of eight children in the family. Elder to her were sisters Annamma, Aleyamma, Thankamma, and brothers John, George, and Joseph. Martha was her younger sister. After her schooling at the Union High School in Cherai, Mary attended the Maharaja's College, Ernakulam, for her college studies. After being among seventy-five women to be invited to the Vellore interviews, Mary Verghese was placed on the waiting list. The fifth women dropped and Mary was in. She got to meet Dr. Ida S. Scudder, the founder of the institution, for the first time at the time of her admission to the course. She had her graduate training in medicine at the Christian Medical College, Vellore between 1946 and 1952. She got to meet Dr. Ida S. Scudder, the founder of the institution, for the first time at the time of her admission to the course. On completing her training in medicine, aspiring to specialise in gynaecology, she joined the department of gynaecology. She was devoted to enduring a life that laid down a foundation of faith and medicine through her work in many clinics.

In addition, she was a Godly woman that aimed to gain a deeper relationship with God while in school. Although she enjoyed spending time with her friends, Mary developed a deep and valuable connection with her religion. Mary found it peaceful and restoring to have her medical education as well as building upon her faith and relationship with God.

Spinal cord injury and later years 
 After graduating, her and some of her colleagues along with the head of gynecology, Dr. Carol Jameson, were traveling in a car and it was then where she was injured in a road crash in 1954 that resulted in complete spinal cord injury. She became paralysed from the waist down (mid thoracic injury). All of her colleagues involved in the crash recovered, except for Mary. Her injuries were managed by Dr. Paul Brand, who subsequently was her mentor and under whom she learnt surgical skills related to leprosy rehabilitation. Dr Paul Brand pointed out that she could sit in her wheelchair and operate on the hands of people with Hansen's Disease.
Following a course of rehabilitation at Australian Rehabilitation Center, Perth, Verghese secured a fellowship at the Institute of Physical Medicine and Rehabilitation, New York, under Dr. Howard A. Rusk, a pioneer in the field. On completing her fellowship in 1962, she returned to India to head the department of physical medicine and rehabilitation at Christian Medical College, Vellore.  She started the rehabilitation institute in 1966, and headed the first fully functional physical rehabilitation unit in the country. She was involved in providing rehabilitation services primarily for persons with spinal cord injury, leprosy, and brain injury. She continued to work at the Christian Medical College until 1976.  Her biography, titled "Take my hand: the remarkable story of Dr. Mary Verghese", authored by Dorothy Clarke Wilson, was published in 1963.

Awards 
In recognition of her contributions to medicine, in particular, to the field of physical rehabilitation in India, Mary Verghese was awarded the Padma Shri by the then President of India, Shri. V.V. Giri in 1972. She was awarded the World Vision Award in 1985. These awards encompassed her pioneer work within her community and the everlasting effects that she made. Additionally, the Mary Verghese Trust, and the first Dr. Mary Verghese Award for Excellence in Empowering Ability was given in 2012 in honor of her.

Death and legacy 
Verghese died in December 1986 at Vellore. The rehabilitation institute established by her has been named in her honour. The Mary Verghese Trust that was started by her in 1986 continues to conduct vocational training programs for persons with physical disabilities. The trust also jointly conducts the annual get-together program for persons with disabilities, the Rehab Mela. In 2012, Mary Verghese Award Foundation was established.

Rehabilitation Institute, CMC Vellore. 
The Mary Varghese Institute of Rehabilitation is part of the Physical Medicine and Rehabilitation Department of the Christian Medical College Vellore. 
The Rehabilitation Institute in Bagayam, Vellore continues to help people with disabilities.

The institute treats people with spinal cord injury, stroke, traumatic brain or head injury, amputations (lost limbs), children with cerebral palsy and many other less common problems. Dr Mary is constantly remembered as the pioneer she was - starting a service that is still going more than 50 years later. As a disabled member in her community with a lack of resources, Dr. Mary returned to India with the Rehabilitation Institute and began to receive patients. Dr. Mary contributed to The Rehabilitation Institute in Bagayam by starting a fund in order to raise money for the people that could not afford these services and disability treatments.

On top of the inpatient and outpatient clinical departments, The Rehabilitation Institute is a well-rounded facility that has special clinics on different days of the week. With a variety of care, the Rehabilitation Institute in Bagayam continues ongoing research to better prosthetics, have cost effective equipment, incorporate virtual reality with the rehabilitation, and advance research in spinal cord regeneration.

The institute was inaugurated by the then Union Health Minister Dr. Sushila Nayyar, on 26 November 1966.

Recipients of Mary Verghese Award

References

1925 births
1986 deaths
Recipients of the Padma Shri in medicine
Indian rehabilitation physicians
Scientists from Kochi
People with paraplegia
Maharaja's College, Ernakulam alumni
Indian women medical doctors
Indian women medical researchers
Women scientists from Kerala
20th-century Indian medical doctors
20th-century Indian women scientists
Indian medical researchers
Medical doctors from Kerala
20th-century women physicians